Special Box is a compilation album released by X Japan on December 25, 1997. It contains two CDs, Art of Life and Dahlia. The album reached number 96 on the Oricon chart.

Track listing 
Disc 1
"Art of Life"

Disc 2
"Dahlia"
"Scars"
"Longing ~Togireta Melody~"
"Rusty Nail"
"White Poem 1"
"Crucify My Love"
"Tears"
"Wriggle"
"Drain"

References 

X Japan compilation albums
1997 compilation albums